David Meriwether (October 30, 1800 – April 4, 1893) was a United States Senator from Kentucky and a Governor of the New Mexico Territory.

Born in Louisa County, Virginia, Meriwether moved with his parents to Jefferson County, Kentucky, in 1803. He attended the common schools and engaged in fur trading in 1818 near what is now Council Bluffs, Iowa. He later engaged in agricultural pursuits in Jefferson County.

Meriwether studied law, was  admitted to the bar, and commenced practice. He was a member of the Kentucky House of Representatives from 1832 to 1845. He was an unsuccessful candidate for election in 1847 to the Thirtieth Congress. He was a delegate to the state constitutional convention in 1849, and was Secretary of State of Kentucky in 1851.

Meriwether was appointed as a Democrat to the United States Senate to fill the vacancy caused by the death of Henry Clay, and served from July 6, 1852 to August 31, 1852, when Archibald Dixon was elected his successor. He was not a candidate for renomination in 1852.

In 1853, Meriwether was appointed by President Franklin Pierce as Governor of the Territory of New Mexico after the position was turned down by Solon Borland, and continued in office to 1855. From April to July 1854, when Meriwether was out of state, the Secretary of the Territory, William S. Messervy, was acting Governor.

Meriwether later served again in the Kentucky House of Representatives from 1858 to 1885, and served as speaker in 1859. After this he retired to his plantation near Louisville, Kentucky. He was interred in Cave Hill Cemetery.

References

Meriwether, David. My Life in the Mountains and on the Plains. Edited by Robert A. Griffen. Norman: University of Oklahoma Press, 1965.

1800 births
1893 deaths
Governors of New Mexico Territory
People from Louisa County, Virginia
Speakers of the Kentucky House of Representatives
Democratic Party members of the Kentucky House of Representatives
Politicians from Louisville, Kentucky
Kentucky lawyers
Burials at Cave Hill Cemetery
Secretaries of State of Kentucky
New Mexico Democrats
Democratic Party United States senators from Kentucky
19th-century American politicians
19th-century American lawyers